May Day is an unincorporated community in Riley County, Kansas, United States.

History
A post office called May Day was established in 1871, and remained in operation until 1954. The post office originally was secured on a May Day, hence the name.

Education
The community is served by Blue Valley USD 384 public school district.

References

Further reading

External links
 Riley County maps: Current, Historic, KDOT

Unincorporated communities in Riley County, Kansas
Unincorporated communities in Kansas